Finland is divided into 69 sub-regional units. The sub-regions are formed by groups of municipalities within the 19 regions of Finland. The sub-regions represent a LAU 1 level of division used in conjunction with the Nomenclature of Territorial Units for Statistics.

Sub-regions grouped by regions

Lapland (1)

Eastern Lapland
Kemi-Tornio sub-region
Northern Lapland
Rovaniemi sub-region
Torne Valley
Tunturi Lapland, i.e. Fell Lapland

North Ostrobothnia (2)

Koillismaa
Nivala-Haapajärvi sub-region
Oulu sub-region
Oulunkaari
Raahe sub-region
Siikalatva sub-region
Ylivieska sub-region

Kainuu (3)

Kajaani sub-region
Kehys-Kainuu

North Karelia (4)

Central Karelia
Joensuu sub-region
Pielinen Karelia

Pohjois-Savo or North Savo (5)

Inner Savonia
Kuopio sub-region
North Eastern Savonia
Upper Savonia
Varkaus sub-region

Etelä-Savo (6)

Mikkeli sub-region
Pieksämäki sub-region
Savonlinna sub-region

South Ostrobothnia (7)

Järviseutu
Kuusiokunnat
Seinäjoki sub-region
Suupohja

Ostrobothnia (8)

Sydösterbotten
Jakobstad sub-region
Vaasa sub-region

Former sub-regions
Kyrönmaa

Pirkanmaa (9)

North Western Pirkanmaa
South Western Pirkanmaa
Southern Pirkanmaa
Tampere sub-region
Upper Pirkanmaa

Former sub-regions
 South Eastern Pirkanmaa

Satakunta (10)

Northern Satakunta
Pori sub-region
Rauma sub-region

Central Ostrobothnia (11)

Kaustinen sub-region
Kokkola sub-region

Central Finland (12)

Äänekoski sub-region
Jämsä sub-region
Joutsa sub-region
Jyväskylä sub-region
Keuruu sub-region
Saarijärvi-Viitasaari sub-region

Southwest Finland (13)

Loimaa sub-region
Salo sub-region
Turku sub-region
Vakka-Suomi
Åboland

South Karelia (14)

Imatra sub-region
Lappeenranta sub-region

Päijät-Häme (15)

Lahti sub-region

Former sub-regions
 Heinola sub-region

Kanta-Häme (16)

Forssa sub-region
Hämeenlinna sub-region
Riihimäki sub-region

Uusimaa (17 and 18)

Helsinki sub-region (Greater Helsinki)
Loviisa sub-region
Porvoo sub-region
Raseborg sub-region

Former sub-regions
 Lohja sub-region

Kymenlaakso (19)

Kotka-Hamina sub-region
Kouvola sub-region

Åland (20)
Archipelago (Åland)
Countryside (Åland)
Mariehamn sub-region

References

External links
 

 
Subdivisions of Finland
Subregions
Finland 2
Subregions, Finland